Kampong Jerudong or simply Jerudong is a village in Brunei-Muara District, Brunei, about  from the capital Bandar Seri Begawan. The population was 3,856 in 2016. It is one of the settlements within Mukim Sengkurong.

The village is home to a few notable places of the country. It is the location of Jerudong Park, the country's sole amusement park, as well as The Empire Hotel and Country Club, a luxury hotel often regarded as one of the notable landmarks of Brunei. Jerudong is also home to Jerudong Park Medical Centre and Pantai Jerudong Specialist Centre, the country's main specialist healthcare centres.

History

Oil exploration 
There had been oil exploration attempts being conducted in Jerudong in the past. In 1914, five shallow wells were drilled but abandoned in the following year due to geological issues. Nevertheless, drilling was renewed in 1940, and subsequently in 1955, by the then British Malayan Petroleum Company, resulting in the six wells being spudded. However, the wells yielded negligible results.

Administration 
For administrative purposes the settlement has been split into, and established as, two village subdivisions, namely Kampong Jerudong 'A' and Kampong Jerudong 'B'. They are among the villages encompassed by Mukim Sengkurong.

Transport

Road 
Jerudong is served by three highways: Muara–Tutong Highway, Jalan Jerudong and Jerudong–Tungku Highway. The Muara–Tutong Highway traverses Jerudong between its northeastern and western points, where as Jalan Jerudong passes through Jerudong in north-south direction; the latter also terminates in the area in the north at Jerudong Beach. The two roads are directly connected via an interchange. They are also indirectly connected via a road which passes through the Jerudong Park area, whereby it is connected to the Highway via an interchange and terminates at the other end at a traffic light junction of Jalan Jerudong. Meanwhile, the western end of Jerudong–Tungku Highway terminates in the east of Jerudong at another traffic light junction of Jalan Jerudong.

Economy 
The economy of Jerudong is based on a mixture of retail, service and hospitality. Jerudong has a number of grocery stores, restaurants and other types of shops which mainly cater the livelihood of the residents. It also has a fish market: Jerudong Market is located close to Jerudong Beach, whereby the fish and other marine produce sold in the market are mainly catches by the fishermen going to the sea from this beach. The Jerudong Market is one if the two largest markets in the country, supported by the Minister of Home Affairs.

Meanwhile, people who are in the service sector are mainly employed in the specialist healthcare centres, namely Jerudong Park Medical Centre and Pantai Jerudong Specialist Centre, where as those in the hospitality industry are mainly employed in the few hotels located in Jerudong, as well as the leisure facilities of Jerudong Park Country Club.

Facilities 
Jerudong Primary School is the village primary school, whereas Jerudong Religious School is the village school for the country's Islamic religious primary education.

The village mosque is Al-Ameerah Al-Hajjah Maryam Mosque; it was inaugurated by Sultan Hassanal Bolkiah on 29 January 1999. It can accommodate 2,000 worshippers. The mosque is a waqf (Islamic endowment) of Mariam binti Abdul Aziz, a former consort of Sultan Hassanal Bolkiah.

Although Jerudong International School is named after this place, it is officially located in Tungku.

Notable places 
Jerudong is home to the following specialist hospitals of the country:
 Jerudong Park Medical Centre which houses Gleneagles JPMC, the heart surgery centre
 Pantai Jerudong Specialist Centre which houses The Brunei Cancer Centre (TBCC) and Brunei Neuroscience Stroke and Rehabilitation Centre (BNSRC)

Culture and leisure

Recreation 
 
Jerudong Park, the country's only amusement park, was opened in 1994. It used to offer free admission, which claimed to be the first amusement park in the world to do so. The park fell into disuse for several years but it was eventually revamped and relaunched in 2014. At present, Jerudong Park features several rides as well as a water park, musical fountain, food court and an indoor amphitheatre for events; the Jerudong Park Amphitheater once hosted concerts by Michael Jackson and Whitney Houston in 1996.

Jerudong Park is located within the grounds of Jerudong Park Country Club, which also includes Royal Brunei Golf and Country Club, one of two golf courses located in Jerudong and one of the few in the country, and Royal Brunei Polo and Riding Club, the country's sole polo club.

The other golf course in Jerudong is located within the compound of the Empire Hotel and Country Club.

Accommodation 
There are a few hotels in Jerudong but the most notable is The Empire Hotel and Country Club. Opened in 2000, it is a luxury 5-star beach resort overlooking the South China Sea, which features 518 rooms, restaurants, event halls, gardens, cinemas and country club that includes a golf course. The Empire Hotel is arguably the flagship hotel of Brunei. It is a member of Worldhotels, a leading organisation of independent hotel around the world.

Miscellaneous 
The BRIDEX International Conference Centre is located in Jerudong. It is a convention centre which formerly hosted the Brunei International Defence Exhibition and Conference, an international event held biennially which showcases exhibition related to arms and defence technology.

References

Jerudong